Emeric Hulme Beaman was born in 1864 in Cudapah, India. He was journalist, mainly as music critic. 
Together with William Senior Ellis, he wrote four mystery novels under the pseudonym "Ben Strong." He died in 1937.

Bibliography
 Ozmar the Mystic: A Novel.  1 vol.  London: Bliss, Sands, and Foster, 1896.
 The Prince's Diamond: The Adventures of George Travers, Esq., Gentleman.  1 vol.  London: Hutchinson, 1898. (sequence of Ozmar the Mystic).
 The Faith that Kills.  1 vol.  London: Hurst and Blackett, 1899.
 The Experiment of Doctor Nevill: A Novel.  1 vol.  London: John Long, 1900.
Short stories
 The Basilisk of the Grange 
 The Sob of the Lay-Figure 
 Adventures of Archibald P. Batts'' The English Illustrated Magazine, Volume XXIII (23), April - September 1900 (Five adventure/crime stories) and The English Illustrated Magazine, Volume XXIV (24), October 1900 - March 1901 (Final crime/adventure story in sequence).

References

1864 births
1937 deaths
19th-century Indian journalists
19th-century Indian novelists
Indian male journalists
Indian music critics
Novelists from Andhra Pradesh